The Holiday Baking Championship is an American cooking competition series produced by Triage Entertainment and aired on Food Network. It airs from early November through late December, covering the U.S Thanksgiving and Christmas season. The first episode premiered on November 9, 2014, and it has become a yearly competition with several spin-off shows, including Spring Baking Championship, Halloween Baking Championship, Kids Baking Championship, and Wedding Cake Championship.

Rounds
Each episode has two rounds. The first round is the "Preliminary Heat" where the bakers must create small pastries centered around a holiday theme.

The person who wins the pre-heat gets an advantage going into the next round and aren't told about it until the second round theme is announced. The advantage usually varies.

The second round is the "Main Heat" where the contestants get more time than the first round to create a larger confection (in size or quantity) that sticks to the holiday theme of the episode. Partway through the main heat, there's often a curveball thrown in that has the bakers adapt or change their plans. The winner of the "Main Heat" advances to the next episode while the baker with the worst dish is eliminated. The three bakers remaining will compete in the final "Main Heat" challenge.

Host and judges
The show's first three seasons were hosted by Bobby Deen. Jesse Palmer has been host of the program since season four.

Cake Baker Duff Goldman (famously known for his popular former Food Network show Ace of Cakes) and Pastry Chef Nancy Fuller (host of current Food Network show Farmhouse Rules) serve as permanent judges of the show. Lorraine Pascale (a former UK model) was a judge for the first six seasons.

For season seven, Carla Hall replaced Pascale on the judges' panel, joining Fuller and Goldman.

Episodes

References

External links 
 

Food Network original programming
Food reality television series
2014 American television series debuts
2010s American cooking television series
English-language television shows